Emanuel Famíra (15 November 1900, Hlinsko – 6 January 1970, Prague), was a Czech sculptor and painter. In 1933 a statue in memory of miners by Famíra was built in village of Vranov in Břasy. Demolished by German authorities in 1941. Famíra, lifelong communist, became one of prominent artists of socialist realism. In 1968–1969 Famíra was member of ultraleft group of Czech communists who supported the Soviet invasion of Czechoslovakia.

References

1900 births
1970 deaths
Czechoslovak communists
20th-century Czech sculptors
Czech male sculptors
20th-century Czech painters
Czech male painters
People from Hlinsko
20th-century Czech male artists